This Is the Night is a 1932 American pre-Code comedy film directed by Frank Tuttle, and starring Lili Damita, Charles Ruggles, Roland Young, Thelma Todd, and Cary Grant in his film debut. It was made by Paramount Pictures.

The plays had already been adapted for film once before as Good and Naughty (1926) with Pola Negri.

Night scenes in this film were intended to be seen in blue tint. Tinting is used on the restored 2011 single DVD version released by Turner Classic Movies.  However, tinting was absent from recent prints prior to restoration.  The version shown on the TCM cable channel in the 1990s was not tinted, nor is the version in the 2016 DVD set "Cary Grant - The Vault Collection".

Plot

When Claire Mathewson's husband Stephen comes back unexpectedly from the 1932 Summer Olympics, where he was supposed to compete in the javelin throw, he discovers the train tickets for a romantic Venice getaway she has planned with her lover Gerald.

Gerald's friend, Bunny, lies and says that the tickets are actually for Gerald and his wife. With Stephen still suspicious, Gerald must find a fake wife to go to Venice with him. He tries to hire the actress Chou-Chou, but since her boyfriend is a jealous man, she gives the job to out-of-work Germaine, who needs the 2000 franc fee to keep from starving. At first, Gerald thinks she is too demure, but she soon convinces him that she can pretend to be a glamorous wife.

The two couples go to Venice. Bunny, attracted to Germaine, decides to join them. On the train, Stephen questions Gerald and Germaine about how they met. When they arrive in Venice, Claire quickly becomes jealous, as both Stephen and Gerald seem fascinated by Germaine. Claire eventually demands that Gerald send Germaine away immediately, so he orders her to leave the next day. Meanwhile, a drunken Bunny climbs a ladder into Germaine's bedroom and offers to take her away. After she turns down his offer, he falls into a canal on his way out and is apprehended by two policemen. Stephen believes he hears a burglar and goes to her room to investigate. The two are then caught in a seemingly compromising position by Gerald and Claire. However, Bunny reappears and explains what really happened. Her love for her husband rekindled, Claire breaks off her affair with Gerald. Germaine reveals to Gerald that she is not in fact Chou-Chou and decides to return to Paris, but Gerald catches up to her in a gondola and asks her to marry him.

Cast

Production
This is the Night is Cary Grant's feature film debut. He disliked his role, believing that a man accepting the unfaithfulness of his wife so calmly was unbelievable. After seeing the film, he decided to quit the movie industry; his friend Orry-Kelly talked him out of it.

Reception
The film received a mixed to positive reception from critics. The reviewer from the Times stated that the "plot is hardly worth repeating, for it is occupied only with the ritual humours of infidelity and intoxication", but he praised Roland Young, Charlie Ruggles and Claire Dodd's performances, describing them as "very skilful". Bob Wagner of Script thought that the film was made to a high standard, with "exceptionally beautiful" cinematography. He spotted Cary Grant as a newcomer in the film and thought that he made a "splendid figure".

References

Sources

External links
 
 
 
 

1932 films
1932 romantic comedy films
American romantic comedy films
American black-and-white films
Films directed by Frank Tuttle
Films set in Paris
Films set in Venice
Paramount Pictures films
1930s English-language films
1930s American films